Drug Design, Development and Therapy is a peer-reviewed medical journal covering research on drug design and development through to clinical applications. The journal was established in 2007 and is published by Dove Medical Press.

External links 
 

English-language journals
Dove Medical Press academic journals
Open access journals
Pharmacology journals
Publications established in 2007